This is a survey of the postage stamps and postal history of Fiji.

Fiji is an island nation in Melanesia in the South Pacific Ocean about 2,000  km northeast of New Zealand's North Island. It is a former British colony.

Early mail and first stamps
Before the first postage stamps of Fiji, mail was carried by trading vessels to Sydney, Australia, and other ports, where it was placed in the mail.

The first stamps of Fiji were issued on 1 November 1870 by the local newspaper, the Fiji Times. The British Consul objected to the service and tried to close it in 1871 and appointed an official Postmaster and the Fiji Times service was closed in 1872.

Stamps were issued by the Kingdom of Fiji in 1871, showing a ‘CR’ monogram for ‘Cakobau Rex', the King of Fiji.

British colony
A British colony was established over Fiji in 1874. Previous issues of the Kingdom of Fiji were overprinted VR for "Victoria Regina", the royal cypher of Queen Victoria. Later issues had designs with a VR monogram.

Stamps with designs common to the British colonies were issued in 1903. The first pictorial set was issued in 1938.

Fiji achieved independence in 1970.

See also 
Revenue stamps of Fiji

References

Further reading 
Phillips, Charles J. The Postage Stamps etc. of the Fiji Islands, Stanley Gibbons, 1908.

External links

Post Fiji - stamps
Pacific Islands Study Circle

Philately of Fiji